Costa Rica competed at the 1988 Summer Olympics in Seoul, South Korea.  Silvia Poll won the nation's first ever Olympic medal.

Medalists

Competitors
The following is the list of number of competitors in the Games.

Results and competitors by event

Athletics
Men's Marathon 
 Ronald Lanzoni — 2:23.45 (→ 40th place)
 Juan Amores — 2:24.49 (→ 45th place)
 Luis López — 2:32.43 (→ 68th place)

Boxing
 Humberto Aranda

Judo
 Henry Núñez Nájera

Swimming
Men's 100m Backstroke
 Horst Niehaus
 Heat – 1:01.91 (→ did not advance, 42nd place)
 Eric Greenwood
 Heat – 1:03.11 (→ did not advance, 45th place)

Men's 200m Backstroke
 Horst Niehaus
 Heat – 2:12.83 (→ did not advance, 34th place)
 Eric Greenwood
 Heat – 2:15.42 (→ did not advance, 35th place)

Men's 200m Individual Medley
 Eric Greenwood
 Heat – 2:15.64 (→ did not advance, 43rd place)
 Horst Niehaus
 Heat – 2:16.16 (→ did not advance, 44th place)

Women's 50m Freestyle
 Carolina Mauri
 Heat – 27.96 (→ did not advance, 33rd place)

Women's 100m Freestyle
 Silvia Poll
 Heat – 56.16
 Final – 55.90 (→ 5th place)
 Carolina Mauri
 Heat – 1:00.14 (→ did not advance, 41st place)

Women's 200m Freestyle
 Silvia Poll
 Heat – 1:59.22
 Final – 1:58.67 (→  Silver Medal)
 Natasha Aguilar
 Heat – 2:10.22 (→ did not advance, 34th place)

Women's 100m Backstroke
 Silvia Poll
 Heat – 1:03.21
 Final – 1:03.34 (→ 6th place)

Women's 100m Breaststroke
 Sigrid Niehaus
 Heat – 1:16.65 (→ did not advance, 35th place)
 Montserrat Hidalgo
 Heat – 1:18.42 (→ did not advance, 36th place)

Women's 200m Breaststroke
 Montserrat Hidalgo
 Heat – 2:44.72 (→ did not advance, 37th place)
 Sigrid Niehaus
 Heat – 2:45.35 (→ did not advance, 38th place)

Women's 100m Butterfly
 Marcela Cuesta
 Heat – 1:07.66 (→ did not advance, 33rd place)

Women's 4 × 100 m Freestyle Relay
 Natasha Aguilar, Marcela Cuesta, Carolina Mauri, and Silvia Poll
 Heat – 3:59.67 (→ did not advance, 12th place)

Women's 4 × 100 m Medley Relay
 Silvia Poll, Sigrid Niehaus, Marcela Cuesta, and Carolina Mauri
 Heat – 4:31.75 (→ did not advance, 15th place)

Weightlifting
 Rafael Elizondo

References

Official Olympic Reports
International Olympic Committee results database

Nations at the 1988 Summer Olympics
1988